Cadwgan  is a Welsh given name, meaning "battle glory" (from cad "battle" and gwogawn "glory"). The name occurs in the Mabinogion as the son of Iddon. The name Cadogan is derived from it.

Bearers of the name include:

 Cadwgan ap Bleddyn (1051–1111)
 Cadwgan ap Meurig (c. 1045–1074)
 Cadwgan of Llandyfai (d. 1241)
 Cadwgan ap Cadwaladr ap Gruffydd (c. 1110–1172)

References

Welsh masculine given names